Here to Stay may refer to:
Here to Stay (Freddie Hubbard album)
Here to Stay (Schon & Hammer album)
Here to Stay (Greg Sczebel album)
Here to Stay (The Slickee Boys album)
Here to Stay, song by Pat Metheny Group from the album We Live Here
"Here to Stay" (Korn song), 2002
"Here to Stay" (Christina Aguilera song)
"Here to Stay" (New Order song), 2002
Here to Stay (Deuteronomium album), an album by the band Deuteronomium
"Here to Stay", a 2020 song by Meghan Trainor from Treat Myself
Here to Stay (TV series), a Canadian dramatic television anthology miniseries